Runscope is a SaaS-based company that sells software for API performance testing, monitoring and debugging. Runscope is based in San Francisco, California.

General 
Runscope provides cloud-based and hybrid on-premises software that allows businesses to monitor, test, and debug web service APIs. Runscope API tests can be used to test against services available in the public cloud, running on a private network behind a firewall, or running on a local development environment.

Integrations 
Runscope integrates with continuous integration and deployment platforms, such as Jenkins, Amazon CodePipeline, CircleCI and TeamCity. Runscope’s API methods for executing tests and checking on test status allows it to be integrated with other CI/CD tools and platforms as well.

Runscope supports a variety of notification options for sending test completion (and failure) results. Runscope integrates with team communication platforms Slack, HipChat and Flowdock. Runscope also integrates with incident management systems  AlertOps, PagerDuty, VictorOps, OpsGenie and StatusPage.io.

Runscope also integrates with third-party software analytics platforms, including New Relic Insights, Keen IO and Datadog.

History 
Runscope was founded in 2013 by John Sheehan and Frank Stratton.

Runscope has raised approximately $7.1 million in venture capital funding. Runscope received its first round of seed funding in May 2013 for the amount of $1.1 million from Andreesen Horowitz, True Ventures, Lerer Hippeau Ventures, Jon Dahl, Nat Friedman, David Cohen, and Ullas Naik. Runscope’s A round of funding was led by General Catalyst Partners.

In September 2017, CA Technologies acquired Runscope. CA Technologies also owns Blazemeter, a load testing platform for software. In July 2019 two platforms were merged into one under Blazemeter brand.

In September 2021, Broadcom, who acquired CA Technologies in 2018, announced that it would sell BlazeMeter to Perforce. Perforce announced that it had completed the acquisition process November 1, 2021.

Acquisitions 
In December 2014, Runscope acquired Ghost Inspector, a company that provides cloud-based UI and browser testing for websites and web applications.

References 

Software testing tools
Companies based in San Francisco
American companies established in 2013
Website monitoring software